The Guangxu Emperor (14 August 1871 – 14 November 1908), personal name Zaitian, was the tenth Emperor of the Qing dynasty, and the ninth Qing emperor to rule over China proper. His reign lasted from 1875 to 1908, but in practice he ruled, without Empress Dowager Cixi's influence, only from 1889 to 1898. He initiated the Hundred Days' Reform, but was abruptly stopped when the Empress Dowager launched a coup in 1898, after which he became powerless and was held under house arrest until his death by poisoning. His era name, "Guangxu", means "glorious succession".

The emperor died in 1908 and it was widely suspected at the time that he had been poisoned. A forensic examination on his remains confirmed in 2008 that the cause of death was arsenic poisoning. The level of arsenic in his remains was 2,000 times higher than normal.

Accession to the throne and upbringing
Zaitian was the second son of Yixuan (Prince Chun), and his primary spouse Yehenara Wanzhen, a younger sister of Empress Dowager Cixi. On 12 January 1875, Zaitian's cousin, the Tongzhi Emperor, died without a son to succeed him. Breaking the imperial convention that a new emperor must always be of a generation after that of the previous emperor, candidates were considered from the generation of the Tongzhi Emperor. Empress Dowager Ci'an suggested choosing one of Prince Gong's sons to be the next emperor, but was overruled by her co-regent, Empress Dowager Cixi. Instead, Cixi nominated Zaitian (her nephew) and the imperial clan eventually agreed with her choice because Zaitian was younger than other adoptable children of the same generation.

Zaitian was named heir and successor to his late uncle, the Xianfeng Emperor, rather than his cousin and predecessor, the Tongzhi Emperor, so as to maintain the father-son succession law. He ascended to the throne at the age of four and adopted "Guangxu" as his regnal name, therefore he is known as the "Guangxu Emperor". He was adopted by Empress Dowager Cixi and Ci'an. Cixi remained as regent under the title "Holy Mother, Empress Dowager" (聖母皇太后) while her co-regent Empress Dowager Ci'an was called "Mother Empress, Empress Dowager" (母后皇太后).

Beginning in 1876, the Guangxu Emperor was taught by Weng Tonghe, who had also been involved in the disastrous upbringing of the Tongzhi Emperor yet somehow managed to be exonerated of all possible charges. Weng instilled in the Guangxu Emperor a  duty of filial piety toward the Empress Dowagers Cixi and Ci'an.

In 1881, when the Guangxu Emperor was nine, Empress Dowager Ci'an died unexpectedly, leaving Empress Dowager Cixi as sole regent for the boy. In Weng's diaries during those days, Guangxu was reportedly seen with swollen eyes, had poor concentration and was seeking consolation from Weng. Weng too expressed his concern that Cixi was the one who had been suffering from chronic ill health, not Ci'an. During this time, the imperial eunuchs often abused their influence over the boy emperor. The Guangxu Emperor had also reportedly begun to hold some audiences on his own as an act of necessity.

Taking over the reins of power

In 1887, the Guangxu Emperor was old enough to begin to rule in his own right, but the previous year, several courtiers, including Prince Chun and Weng Tonghe, had petitioned Empress Dowager Cixi to postpone her retirement from the regency. Despite Cixi's agreement to remain as regent, by 1886 the Guangxu Emperor had begun to write comments on memorials to the throne. In the spring of 1887, he partook in his first field-plowing ceremony, and by the end of the year he had begun to rule under Cixi's supervision.

Eventually, in February 1889, in preparation for Cixi's retirement, the Guangxu Emperor was married. Much to the emperor's dislike, Cixi selected her niece, Jingfen, to be empress. She became known as Empress Longyu. She also selected a pair of sisters, who became Consorts Jin and Zhen, to be the emperor's concubines. The following week, with the Guangxu Emperor married, Cixi retired from the regency.

Years in power

Even after the Guangxu Emperor began formal rule, Empress Dowager Cixi continued to influence his decisions and actions, despite residing several months of the year at the Summer Palace. Weng Tonghe reportedly observed that while the emperor attended to day-to-day state affairs, in more difficult cases the emperor and the Grand Council sought Cixi's advice. In fact, the emperor often journeyed to the Summer Palace to pay his respects to his aunt and to discuss state affairs with her.

In March 1891, the Guangxu Emperor received the foreign ministers to China at an audience in the "Pavilion of Purple Light", in what is now part of Zhongnanhai, something that had also been done by the Tongzhi Emperor in 1873. That summer, under pressure from the foreign legations and in response to revolts in the Yangtze River valley that were targeting Christian missionaries, the emperor issued an edict ordering Christians to be placed under state protection.

The Guangxu Emperor, while growing up, apparently had been instilled with the importance of frugality. In 1892, he tried to implement a series of draconian measures to reduce expenditures by the Imperial Household Department, which proved to be one of his few administrative successes. But it was only a partial victory, as he had to approve higher expenditures than he would have liked to meet Cixi's needs.

1894 saw the outbreak of the First Sino-Japanese War. During the war, even though the Guangxu Emperor was nominally the sovereign ruler of the Qing Empire, officials often ignored him and instead sent their memorials to Cixi for her approval. Eventually, two sets of Grand Council memoranda were created, one for the emperor and the other for the empress dowager, a practice that continued until it was rendered unnecessary by the events in the autumn of 1898. Following the Qing Empire's defeat and forced agreement to the terms of the Treaty of Shimonoseki, the Guangxu Emperor reportedly expressed his wish to abdicate. The emperor and the Qing government faced further humiliation in late 1897 when the German Empire used the murders of two priests in Shandong Province as an excuse to occupy Jiaozhou Bay, prompting a "scramble for concessions" by other foreign powers.

Following the war and the scramble for concessions, the Guangxu Emperor came to believe that by learning from constitutional monarchies like Japan, the Qing Empire would become more politically and economically powerful. In June 1898, the emperor began the Hundred Days' Reform, aimed at a series of sweeping political, legal and social changes. For a brief time, after Cixi's supposed retirement, the Guangxu Emperor issued edicts for a massive number of far-reaching modernizing reforms with the help of more progressive officials such as Kang Youwei and Liang Qichao.

Changes ranged from infrastructure to industry and the civil examination system. The Guangxu Emperor issued decrees allowing the establishment of a modern university in Beijing, the construction of the Lu-Han railway, and a system of budgets similar to that of Western governments. The initial goal was to make China a modern constitutional empire, but still within the traditional framework, as with Japan's Meiji Restoration.

The reforms, however, were not only too sudden for a China still under significant neo-Confucian influence and other elements of traditional culture, but also came into conflict with Cixi, who held real power. Many officials, deemed useless and dismissed by the Guangxu Emperor, begged her for help. Although Cixi did nothing to stop the Hundred Days' Reform from taking place, she knew the only way to secure her power base was to stage a military coup. The Guangxu Emperor became aware of such a plan, so he asked Kang Youwei and his reformist allies to plan his rescue. They decided to use the help of Yuan Shikai, who had a modernized army, albeit only 6,000-strong. Cixi relied on Ronglu's army in Tianjin.

Ronglu also had an ally, General Dong Fuxiang, who commanded 10,000 Muslim Kansu Braves, including generals such as Ma Fuxiang and Ma Fulu, stationed in the Beijing metropolitan area. Armed with more advanced firearms and artillery, they sided with Cixi's conservative faction during the coup.

The day before the staged coup was supposed to take place, Yuan Shikai revealed everything to Ronglu, exposing the Guangxu Emperor's plans. This gained Yuan Shikai the trust of Cixi, as well as the status of lifetime enemy of the Guangxu Emperor as well as the emperor's younger half-brother, Zaifeng. Following the exposure of the plot, the emperor and empress dowager met, and the emperor retreated to the Yingtai Pavilion, a palace on a lake that is now part of the Zhongnanhai Compound.

Lei Chia-sheng (雷家聖), a Taiwanese history professor, proposes an alternative view: that the Guangxu Emperor might have been led into a trap by the reformists led by Kang Youwei, who in turn was in Lei's opinion tricked by British missionary Timothy Richard and former Japanese prime minister Itō Hirobumi into agreeing to appoint Itō as one of many foreign advisors. British ambassador Claude MacDonald claimed that the reformists had actually "much injured" the modernization of China. Lei claims that Cixi learned of the plot and decided to put an end to it to prevent China from coming under foreign control.

Under house arrest after 1898

The Guangxu Emperor's duties after 1898 became rather limited. The emperor was effectively removed from power as emperor (despite keeping the title), but he did retain some status.

The emperor was kept informed of state affairs, reading them with Cixi prior to audiences, and was also present at audiences, sitting on a stool to Cixi's left hand while Cixi occupied the main throne. He discharged his ceremonial duties, such as offering sacrifices during ceremonies, but never ruled alone again.

In 1898, shortly after the collapse of the Hundred Days' Reform, the Guangxu Emperor's health began to decline, prompting Cixi to name Pujun, a son of the emperor's cousin, the reactionary Prince Duan, as heir presumptive. Pujun and his father were removed from their positions after the Boxer Rebellion. He was examined by a physician at the French Legation and diagnosed with chronic nephritis; he was also discovered to be impotent at the time.

During the Boxer Rebellion, Emperor Guangxu fiercely opposed the idea of using usurpers as a means to counter foreign invasion. His letter to then United States president Theodore Roosevelt is still preserved in U.S. government archives. On 14 August 1900, the Guangxu Emperor, along with Cixi, Empress Longyu and some other court officials, fled from Beijing as the forces of the Eight-Nation Alliance marched on the capital to relieve the legations that had been besieged during the Boxer Rebellion.

Returning to the capital in January 1902, after the withdrawal of the foreign powers, the Guangxu Emperor spent the next few years working in his isolated palace with watches and clocks, which had been a childhood fascination, some say in an effort to pass the time until Cixi's death. He also read widely and spent time learning English from Cixi's Western-educated lady-in-waiting, Yu Deling. His relationship with Empress Longyu, Cixi's niece (and the Emperor's own first cousin), also improved to some extent.

Death
The Guangxu Emperor died on 14 November 1908, a day before Cixi's death, at the age of 37. For a long time there were several theories about the emperor's death, none of which was accepted fully by historians. Most were inclined to believe that Cixi, herself very ill, poisoned the Guangxu Emperor because she was afraid he would reverse her policies after her death. China Daily quoted a historian, Dai Yi, who speculated that Cixi might have known of her imminent death and worried that the Guangxu Emperor would continue his reforms after her death. Another theory is that the Guangxu Emperor was poisoned by Yuan Shikai, who knew that if the emperor were to come to power again, Yuan would likely be executed for treason. There were no reliable sources to prove who murdered the Guangxu Emperor. In 1911, Cixi's former eunuch Li Lianying was murdered, possibly by Yuan, implying that they had conspired in the emperor's murder. This theory was offered by Puyi in his biography; he claimed he heard it from an old eunuch.

The medical records kept by the Guangxu Emperor's physician show the emperor suffered from "spells of violent stomachaches" and that his face had turned blue, typical symptoms of arsenic poisoning. To dispel persistent rumors that the emperor had been poisoned, the Qing imperial court produced documents and doctors' records suggesting that the Guangxu Emperor died from natural causes, but these did not allay suspicion.

On 4 November 2008, forensic tests revealed that the level of arsenic in the emperor's remains was 2,000 times higher than that of ordinary people. Scientists concluded that the poison could only have been administered in a high dose at one time.

The Guangxu Emperor was succeeded by Cixi's choice as heir, his nephew Puyi, who took the regnal name "Xuantong". In January 1912, the Guangxu Emperor's consort, who had become Empress Dowager Longyu, placed her seal on the abdication decree, ending two thousand years of imperial rule in China. Longyu died childless in 1913.

After the Xinhai Revolution of 1911–1912, the Chinese Republic funded the construction of the Guangxu Emperor's mausoleum in the Western Qing Tombs. The tomb was robbed during the Chinese Civil War and the underground palace (burial chamber) is now open to the public.

Appraisal
In 1912, Sun Yat-sen praised the Guangxu Emperor for his educational reform package that allowed China to learn more about Western culture. After the establishment of the People's Republic of China in 1949, historian Fan Wenlan (范文瀾) called the Guangxu Emperor "a Manchu noble who could accept Western ideas". Some historians believe that the Guangxu Emperor was the first Chinese leader to implement modernizing reforms and capitalism. Imperial power in the Qing dynasty saw its nadir under Guangxu, and he was the only Qing emperor to have been put under house arrest during his own reign.

Honours 

Domestic honours
 Sovereign of the Order of the Peacock Feather
 Sovereign of the Order of the Blue Feather
 Sovereign of the Order of the Double Dragon

Foreign honours
 : Grand Cordon of the Order of Leopold (military), 18 July 1898
 : Knight of the Order of the Black Eagle, in Diamonds, 28 June 1898
 : Knight Grand Cross of the Order of Kamehameha I, 1882
 : Grand Cordon of the Order of the Chrysanthemum, 29 April 1899
 : Grand Cross of the Sash of the Three Orders, 1904
 : Order of St. Andrew

Family 

The Guangxu Emperor had one empress and two consorts in total. The emperor was forced by Empress Dowager Cixi to marry her niece (his cousin) Jingfen, who was two years his senior. Jingfen's father, Guixiang (Cixi's younger brother), and Cixi selected her to be the Guangxu Emperor's Empress Consort in order to strengthen the power of her own family. After the marriage, Jingfen was made empress and was granted the honorific title of "Longyu", meaning "auspicious and prosperous" after the death of her husband. However, the Guangxu Emperor detested Empress Longyu, and spent most of his time with his favorite concubine, Consort Zhen, (better known in English as the "Pearl Consort"). Rumors allege that in 1900, Consort Zhen was drowned by being thrown into a well on Cixi's order after Consort Zhen begged Empress Dowager Cixi to let the Guangxu Emperor stay in Beijing for negotiations with the foreign powers. That incident happened before Empress Dowager Cixi was preparing to leave the Forbidden City due to the occupation of Beijing by the Eight-Nation Alliance in 1900. Like his predecessor, the Tongzhi Emperor, the Guangxu Emperor died without issue. After the Guangxu Emperor's death in 1908, Empress Dowager Longyu reigned in cooperation with Zaifeng (Prince Chun).

Empress

 Empress Xiaodingjing, of the Yehe Nara clan (孝定景皇后 葉赫那拉氏; 28 January 1868 – 22 February 1913), first cousin, personal name Jingfen (靜芬)

Imperial Noble Consort

 Imperial Noble Consort Wenjing, of the Tatara clan (溫靖皇貴妃 他他拉氏; 6 October 1873 – 24 September 1924)
 Imperial Noble Consort Keshun, of the Tatara clan (恪順皇貴妃 他他拉氏; 27 February 1876 – 15 August 1900)

Ancestry

See also

 Family tree of Chinese monarchs (late)
 First Sino-Japanese War
 Boxer Rebellion
 List of unsolved murders

References

Further reading
 Hudson, James J. "A Game of Thrones in China: The Case of Cixi, Empress Dowager of the Qing Dynasty (1835–1908)." in Queenship and the Women of Westeros (Palgrave Macmillan, Cham, 2020) pp. 3–27. 
 Rawski, Evelyn S. The last emperors: A social history of Qing imperial institutions (Univ of California Press, 1998).

External links 
 scholarly studies
 

1870s in China
1871 births
1880s in China
1890s in China
1900s in China
1908 deaths
1908 murders in China
19th-century Chinese monarchs
20th-century Chinese monarchs
20th-century murdered monarchs
20th-century murders in China
Child monarchs from Asia
Chinese dissidents
Chinese people of the Boxer Rebellion
3
3
3
Male murder victims
Murdered Chinese emperors
Murdered royalty
Qing dynasty emperors
Unsolved murders in China
Deaths from arsenic poisoning
People from Beijing